Greg Eurell (born 17 June 1960) is an Australian racing trainer best known for training the champion Apache Cat and Cox Plate winner Pinker Pinker.

Also a talented equestrian he represented Australia in show jumping at the 1984 Olympic Games held in Los Angeles.

See also
 Thoroughbred racing in Australia

References 

1960 births
Olympic equestrians of Australia
Australian male equestrians
Equestrians at the 1984 Summer Olympics
Australian racehorse trainers
Living people